James Jacob Nelson (born June 5, 1989) is an American professional baseball pitcher for the Los Angeles Dodgers of Major League Baseball (MLB). He has previously played in MLB for the Milwaukee Brewers.

Amateur career
Nelson attended Niceville High School in Niceville, Florida. The Cincinnati Reds selected Nelson in the 39th round of the 2007 Major League Baseball draft, but he did not sign with the Reds. He attended the University of Alabama, and played college baseball for the Alabama Crimson Tide. In 2010, his junior year, he had a 9-3 win-loss record with a 4.01 earned run average (ERA) in 18 games (17 starts).

Professional career

Milwaukee Brewers
The Milwaukee Brewers selected Nelson in the second round of the 2010 Major League Baseball draft.

Nelson started the 2013 season with the Double-A Huntsville Stars. He was promoted to the Triple-A Nashville Sounds on June 5. He was promoted to the majors on September 3, made his debut on September 6, and made his first major league start on September 28.

Prior to the 2014 season, Nelson was rated the Brewers' top prospect and 96th best prospect in baseball by Baseball America. Nelson began 2014 back at Triple-A Nashville, and dominated the Pacific Coast League to the tune of a 10–2 record, 1.46 ERA, and 114 strikeouts. Nelson was even named 2014 PCL Pitcher of the Year.  He made one spot start for Milwaukee against the Miami Marlins due to a minor injury suffered by Yovani Gallardo on May 25, and recorded his first major league win, pitching  scoreless innings with 3 walks and 6 strikeouts.

On July 10, Nelson was recalled again to join the starting rotation in place of the home run-prone Marco Estrada.  He got his first career base hit during his July 17 start.  Nelson sustained an injury on September 17 against the St. Louis Cardinals when Tommy Pham hit a line drive that ricocheted off his head.  Nelson was able to leave the field in his own ability, and a magnetic resonance image (MRI) revealed a contusion. In 2015 he had an ERA of 4.11 and shared the major league lead in hit batsmen, with 13.

In 2016 he had an ERA of 4.62 and shared the major league lead in hit batsmen, with 17.

On September 8, 2017, Nelson suffered an apparent shoulder injury while sliding to first base, and left the game. The next day, on September 9, it was revealed that he was diagnosed with a right rotator cuff strain and a partial anterior labrum tear, meaning that he would take no further part in any action for the remainder of the 2017 season. Nelson finished the 2017 year with a 12–6 record, 199 strikeouts, and a 3.49 ERA.

On December 2, 2019, Nelson was non-tendered and became a free agent.

Los Angeles Dodgers
On January 7, 2020, Nelson signed a one-year, $1.25 million, contract with the Los Angeles Dodgers that also included an option for 2021. On July 6, it was announced that Nelson would undergo surgery on his lower back and would miss the entire season.

On October 30, 2020, the Dodgers declined their team option on Nelson's contract for the  season, making him a free agent without having thrown a pitch for the organization. On December 11, 2020, Nelson re-signed with the Dodgers on a minor league contract. On March 25, 2021, Nelson was selected to the 40-man roster. Nelson pitched in 28 games for the Dodgers with a 1–2 record and a 1.86 ERA with 44 strikeouts and only 13 walks but he was unable to remain healthy. He missed 18 games with forearm inflammation and another 14 with a left lumbar strain before he was shutdown in early August when it was determined that he would need both Tommy John surgery and a flexor tendon repair in his right arm.

On March 15, 2022, Nelson signed a one-year contract to return to the Dodgers, which contained a club option for the 2023 season. He remained on the injured list all season and the Dodgers declined his option. 

On February 16, 2023, Nelson re-signed with the Dodgers on a one-year, $1.2 million contract plus bonuses.

Scouting report

Nelson throws four pitches.  He relies primarily on his sinker (95 mph), fourseam fastball (94 mph) and slider (84 mph). He also occasionally throws a change up (88 mph).

Personal life
Nelson married longtime girlfriend Melissa Conway on December 10, 2016, in Nashville, Tennessee.

References

External links

Alabama Crimson Tide bio

1989 births
Living people
People from Klamath Falls, Oregon
Baseball players from Florida
Milwaukee Brewers players
Los Angeles Dodgers players
Alabama Crimson Tide baseball players
Helena Brewers players
Wisconsin Timber Rattlers players
Brevard County Manatees players
Huntsville Stars players
Phoenix Desert Dogs players
Nashville Sounds players
San Antonio Missions players
Major League Baseball pitchers